Hypomma is a genus of  dwarf spiders that was first described by David B. Hirst in 1886.

Species
 it contains ten species, found in China, Equatorial Guinea, Japan, Kazakhstan, Macedonia, Russia, Turkey, and the United States:
Hypomma affine Schenkel, 1930 – Russia (north-eastern Siberia, Far East), Japan
Hypomma bituberculatum (Wider, 1834) (type) – Europe, Turkey, Russia (Europe to Far East), Kazakhstan, Kyrgyzstan, China
Hypomma brevitibiale (Wunderlich, 1980) – Macedonia
Hypomma clypeatum Roewer, 1942 – Equatorial Guinea (Bioko)
Hypomma coalescera (Kritscher, 1966) – New Caledonia
Hypomma cornutum (Blackwall, 1833) – Europe, Russia (Europe to South Siberia)
Hypomma fulvum (Bösenberg, 1902) – Europe
Hypomma marxi (Keyserling, 1886) – USA
Hypomma nordlandicum Chamberlin & Ivie, 1947 – USA (Alaska)
Hypomma subarcticum Chamberlin & Ivie, 1947 – USA (Alaska)

See also
 List of Linyphiidae species (A–H)

References

Araneomorphae genera
Cosmopolitan spiders
Linyphiidae
Taxa named by Friedrich Dahl